Francisco Mendoza de León, D.D. (born June 11, 1947) is a Filipino prelate of the Catholic Church and bishop of the Diocese of Antipolo since 2016.

Biography
De León was born June 11, 1947 in La Huerta, Parañaque, Philippines. He studied philosophy at Our Lady of Guadalupe Minor Seminary and theology at San Carlos Seminary. He was ordained a priest on June 28, 1975, by Manila Archbishop Jaime Sin.

He served as an assistant parish priest of Santa Clara de Montefalco Parish in Pasay for 2 years before he was appointed director of studies, then prefect of discipline and finally rector at Our Lady of Guadalupe Minor Seminary. He was later named as rector of San Carlos Seminary from 1986 to 1991. He was the parish priest of St. Andrew the Apostle Parish in Makati from 1991 to 1993, Holy Eucharist Parish in Moonwalk, Parañaque from 1993 to 1998, and Archdiocesan Shrine of the Divine Mercy in Mandaluyong in 2001. He became rector of San Carlos Seminary once again from 1998 to 2001.

On June 27, 2007, Pope Benedict XVI appointed him Auxiliary Bishop of Antipolo and Titular Bishop of Boseta. He was consecrated on September 1, 2007, by Gaudencio Rosales, the Cardinal-Archbishop of Manila; the co-consecrators were Socrates Villegas, Bishop of Balanga, and Gabriel Reyes, Bishop of Antipolo.

On January 25, 2013, after the resignation of the Most Rev. Deogracias Iñiguez Jr., due to his health condition, Bishop de León was appointed as the Apostolic Administrator of the Diocese of Kalookan.

On November 22, 2015, Pope Francis, appointed him Coadjutor Bishop of Antipolo after serving as auxiliary bishop for almost eight years. He succeeded Reyes as Bishop of Antipolo on September 10, 2016, upon Reyes's retirement.

References

1947 births
Living people
Bishops appointed by Pope Benedict XVI
People from Parañaque
People from Rizal